"Now and Then" (sometimes referred to as "I Don't Want to Lose You" or "Miss You") is an unfinished song by John Lennon, recorded in 1978 as a solo piano/vocal demo. After his murder, it was considered as a third possible reunion single by his former band, the Beatles, for their 1995 autobiographical project The Beatles Anthology, following "Free as a Bird" and "Real Love". This version remains unreleased.

Composition
Lennon wrote "Now and Then" in the late 1970s. He recorded the unfinished piece of music in a demo form at his home at the Dakota Building, New York City, 1978. The lyrics are typical of the apologetic love songs that Lennon wrote in the latter half of his career. For the most part the verses are nearly complete, though there are still a few lines that Lennon did not flesh out on the demo tape performance.

The Beatles' version
In January 1994, Paul McCartney was given two tape cassettes by Lennon's widow Yoko Ono that included home recordings of songs Lennon never completed or released commercially. The songs on one of the tapes included the eventually completed and released "Free as a Bird" and "Real Love". The two other songs on the other tape were "Grow Old with Me" and "Now and Then". In March 1995, the three surviving Beatles began work on "Now and Then" by recording a rough backing track that was to be used as an overdub. However, after only two days of recording, all work on the song ceased and plans for a third reunion single were scrapped.

Producer Jeff Lynne reported that sessions for "Now and Then" consisted only of "one day—one afternoon, really — messing with it. The song had a chorus but is almost totally lacking in verses. We did the backing track, a rough go that we really didn't finish." An additional factor behind scrapping the song was a technical defect in the original recording. As with "Real Love", a 60-cycle mains hum can be heard throughout Lennon's demo recording. However, it was noticeably louder on '"Now and Then", making it much harder to remove.

The project was largely shelved due to Harrison's dislike of the song. McCartney later stated that Harrison called Lennon's demo recording "fucking rubbish." McCartney told Q Magazine in 1997 that "George [Harrison] didn't like it. The Beatles being a democracy, we
didn't do it." An unnamed participant in the sessions told the Daily Express: "George just didn’t want to rework it because it’s not a matter of putting some vocals, or a bit of bass and drums to finish it. With this, you have to really build the song."

Bootlegs and reports
Throughout 2005 and 2006, press reports speculated that McCartney and Starr would release a complete version of the song in the future. On 29 April 2007, the Daily Express reported that the song might be released to coincide with the Beatles catalogue being released for the first time via digital download. Additional reports circulated that same year that McCartney was hoping to complete the song as a "Lennon–McCartney composition" by writing new verses, laying down a new drum track recorded by Ringo Starr, and utilising archival recordings of Harrison's guitar work.

The only (official) available recording of the song is Lennon's original demo. In February 2009, the same version of Lennon's recording was released on a bootleg CD, taken from a different source, with none of the "buzz" which hampered the Beatles recording of the song in 1995. The overdubs added in 1995 by the other surviving members have yet to surface.

During a Jeff Lynne documentary shown on BBC Four in 2012, Paul McCartney stated about the song: "And there was another one that we started working on, but George went off it...that one's still lingering around, so I'm going to nick in with Jeff and do it.  Finish it, one of these days."

McCartney said in October 2021 that he still hoped to finish the track.

See also
 The Beatles Anthology
 The Beatles bootlegs

References

External links
 Audio clip of the original "Now and Then" demo
 Audio clip of the original "Now and Then" demo, cleaned up, with the problematic buzz removed completely.
 Audio clip of the 2007 "Now and Then" mix purported to be the version with the actual Beatles' overdubs from 1995.
 Paul McCartney regrets not finishing third Beatles reunion song

The Beatles songs
John Lennon songs
Song recordings produced by Jeff Lynne
Songs written by John Lennon
Unreleased songs
The Beatles Anthology